This article provides information on candidates who stood for the 1970 Australian Senate election. The election was held on 21 November 1970.

Retiring Senators

Labor
Senator Felix Dittmer (Qld)
Senator Bert Hendrickson (Vic)
Senator Pat Kennelly (Vic)
Senator James Ormonde (NSW)
Senator Clem Ridley (SA)
Senator Jim Toohey (SA)

Liberal
Senator George Branson (WA)
Senator Sir Alister McMullin (NSW)
Senator Malcolm Scott (WA)
Senator Dame Ivy Wedgwood (Vic)

Country
Senator Douglas Scott (NSW)

Senate
Sitting Senators are shown in bold text. Tickets that elected at least one Senator are highlighted in the relevant colour. Successful candidates are identified by an asterisk (*).

New South Wales
Six seats were up for election. One of these was a short-term vacancy caused by Country Party Senator Colin McKellar's death; this was held in the interim by Douglas Scott. The Labor Party was defending two seats. The Liberal-Country Coalition was defending four seats. Senators Bob Cotton (Liberal), Joe Fitzgerald (Labor), Doug McClelland (Labor) and Lionel Murphy (Labor) were not up for re-election.

Queensland

Five seats were up for election. The Labor Party was defending two seats. The Liberal-Country Coalition was defending two seats. The Democratic Labor Party was defending one seat. Senators Condon Byrne (Democratic Labor), George Georges (Labor), Ron Maunsell (Country), Bertie Milliner (Labor) and Dame Annabelle Rankin (Liberal) were not up for re-election.

South Australia

Five seats were up for election. The Labor Party was defending four seats. The Liberal Party was defending one seat. Senators Reg Bishop (Labor), Nancy Buttfield (Liberal), Jim Cavanagh (Labor), Condor Laucke (Liberal) and Harold Young (Liberal) were not up for re-election.

Tasmania

Five seats were up for election. The Labor Party was defending three seats. The Liberal Party was defending two seats. Senators Bob Poke (Labor), Peter Rae (Liberal), Reg Turnbull (Independent), Ken Wriedt (Labor) and Reg Wright (Liberal) were not up for re-election.

Victoria

Six seats were up for election. One of these was a short-term vacancy caused by Labor Senator Sam Cohen's death; this had been filled in the interim by Bill Brown. The Labor Party was defending three seats. The Liberal Party was defending two seats. The Democratic Labor Party was defending one seat. Senators Sir Magnus Cormack (Liberal), Jack Little (Democratic Labor), George Poyser (Labor) and James Webster (Country) were not up for re-election.

Western Australia

Five seats were up for election. The Labor Party was defending two seats. The Liberal Party was defending two seats. The Country Party was defending one seat. Senators Edgar Prowse (Country), Peter Sim (Liberal), Don Willesee (Labor), Laurie Wilkinson (Labor) and Reg Withers (Liberal) were not up for re-election.

Summary by party 

Beside each party is an indication of whether the party contested the Senate election in each state.

See also
 1970 Australian Senate election
 Members of the Australian Senate, 1968–1971
 Members of the Australian Senate, 1971–1974
 List of political parties in Australia

References
Adam Carr's Election Archive - Senate 1970

1970 in Australia
Candidates for Australian federal elections